Anastasia Rodionova and Elena Vesnina were the defending champions, but Vesnina decided not to participate this year. Rodionova partnered with Galina Voskoboeva, but lost in the first round to Neha Uberoi and Shikha Uberoi.

Carly Gullickson and Laura Granville won the title, defeating Jill Craybas and Alina Jidkova 6–3, 6–4 in the final.

Seeds

Draw

References
Main Draw

Challenge Bell
Tournoi de Québec
Can